Grizedale Forest is a 24.47 km2 area of woodland in the Lake District of North West England, located to the east of Coniston Water and to the south of Hawkshead. It is made up of a number of hills, small tarns and the settlements of Grizedale and Satterthwaite. It is owned and managed by Forestry England and is a popular tourist destination with waymarked footpaths, mountain biking, an aerial assault course, a 16-bed hostel, and a visitor centre with a children's playground, education centre, café and shop. The car-parking of Grizedale Forest Visitors Centre is situated on the site of the former Grizedale Hall where its remains can be still seen.

In past years, several stages on the WRC RAC Rally were held on tracks through Grizedale Forest every winter. The forest continues to be used for two annual rallies: the Malcolm Wilson Rally and the Grizedale Stages Rally, based in Coniston.

History 
The name Grizedale means Valley of the Pigs. It is home to the last native herd of Red Deer.

Historically, Grizedale formed part of Lancashire North of the Sands.

The last standing Grizedale Hall was built in 1905 by Harold Brocklebank. During World War II it was used as a prisoner of war camp for German Officers, one of whom famously managed to escape. Brocklebank sold the Grizedale Estate to Forestry England in 1937. The Hall was torn down in 1957.

Sculpture trail 
Scattered throughout the forest are approximately 50 sculptures, often made from naturally occurring materials such as stone and wood. The project to place sculptures in the forest was started by the Bill Grant OBE who formed the Grizedale Society in 1977, along with help from Peter Davies of Northern Arts. The sculpture trail was awarded the 1990 Prudential Award for the Arts in 1990 “In tribute for a leap of imagination that has enriched our perception and understanding of art in the landscape”.

Over 250 sculptures have been sited over the years, being constructed of natural materials they have slowly returned to the forest. Unique to Grizedale's Sculpture Trail was a residency programme for the artists, allowing them to work on site for 6 months to create a sculpture inspired by the location. Notable sculptors have included David Nash, Sally Matthews Andy Goldsworthy, Robert Koenig, Walter Bailey and Michael Winstone.

In 1997 Bill Grant stepped down as Director of the Grizedale Society and Adam Sutherland was appointed his replacement in 1999. Sutherland stopped the artist residency programme and focused on changing the style of sculpture from organic found materials to plastic. In 1999 Sutherland formed Grizedale Arts, a new organisation which merged with the Grizedale Society. In 2005 Grizedale Arts split from Forestry England entirely. Grizedale Arts is now based at Lawson Park, while Forestry England continues to run the Sculpture Trail which has more recently returned to commissioning sculptures using natural materials again.

Recreation 
Grizedale Forest was one of the first Forestry England forests in England to allow members of the public to visit. Initially visitors came to watch wildlife, with several high hides positioned around the forest for bird watching. In 1977 the sculpture trail was created, siting artworks along the 10 mile long Silurian Way footpath. Subsequent footpaths were created across the forest with different coloured marker posts providing walks for different levels of ability. More recently focus has turned to other forms of recreation including mountain biking, Go Ape, and Segway hire.

One quarter of the 200,000 visitors to Grizedale per year cycle. A new 9.7 mile mountain biking trail, the £167,000 North Face Trail, was opened in March 2006.

The highest point within Grizedale Forest is the 314 m high Carron Crag, overlooking a wooden panopticon sculpture.

Ropes course 
At the forest along the trail there is a high ropes course which consists of ziplines, rope crossings and Tarzan swings. There is a 10-year-old age limit and a minimum height of 4 ft 7 inches (139.4 cm).

Gallery

See also

Grizedale College, a constituent college of the University of Lancaster named after the forest

References
Forestry England Grizedale Forest site
Grizedale Forest on visitcumbria.com
Grizedale Forest info
Grizedale Forest Park & Visitor Centre on UKattraction.com
BritishCycling article on the North Face Trail

External links

Forests and woodlands of Cumbria
Tourist attractions in Cumbria
Grizedale Forest
Parks and open spaces in Cumbria